The St. George's Church, Vesoul is a church in Vesoul, in France.

Gallery

References

External links

Vesoul

fr:Église Saint-Georges de Vesoul